HOMO: Journal of Comparative Human Biology is a quarterly peer-reviewed scientific journal covering the study of human biology. It was established in 1949 by Egon Freiherr von Eickstedt and was published by Elsevier up to and including Volume 69 (2018) on behalf of the Australasian Society for Human Biology, of which it is the official journal. According to the Journal Citation Reports, the journal had a 2018 impact factor of 0.788.

From Volume 70 (2019) the journal is published by E. Schweizerbart Science Publishers, quarterly (four issues, formerly 6, but in a larger sub-A4 format). HOMO is planned to be a gold Open Access journal from volume 73 (2022).

The editors-in-chief are Maciej Henneberg (University of Adelaide), Andrea Cucina (Universidad Autónoma de Yucatán), Friedrich W. Rösing (University of Ulm, son of von Eickstedt's assistant, Ilse Schwidestsky), Frank J. Rühli (University of Zurich), and Stanley J. Ulijaszek (University of Oxford).

References

External links
 E. Schweizerbart : From Volume 70 (2019)
 : upto Volume 69 (2018)
  abstracts of Volume 52 (2001) – Volume 69 (2018)

Anthropology journals
Bimonthly journals
E. Schweizerbart academic journals
Elsevier academic journals
English-language journals
Human biology journals
Publications established in 1949